Košarkarski klub Škofja Loka, commonly referred to as KK Škofja Loka, is a men's basketball team based in Škofja Loka, Slovenia. The club was founded in 1954 and currently competes under the name LTH Castings due to sponsorship reasons.

Its women's team made four appearances in the Ronchetti Cup through the first half of the 1990s. Its best results in the 1. SKLŽ are third (1992, 1995) and fourth (1993, 1994, 1997, 2004) positions. In 2011 it withdrew from the championship.

Honours
Slovenian Second League
Winners: 1996–97, 2004–05, 2014–15, 2021–22

References

External links
 

Basketball teams established in 1954
Basketball teams in Slovenia
1954 establishments in Slovenia
Basketball teams in Yugoslavia